Sog (more commonly Sogið ) is a river in Iceland.

There are three hydroelectric power stations on the river: Ljósafossstöð  (15 MW), Írafossstöð  (48 MW) and Steingrímsstöð  (27 MW).

The river runs through two lakes, Úlfljótsvatn and Álftavatn .

It has a healthy stock of arctic char and Atlantic salmon. The size of the char can be anywhere from 0.5 pounds up the 5.0 pounds with an average size of one pound.  The most common weight for salmon is 5.0 to 10.0 pounds with a few fish caught each year from 20.0 to 30.0 pounds. There are also brown trout in the River.

Rivers of Iceland